English baseball, is a bat-and-ball game played mainly in Merseyside, Liverpool. It is closely related to the game of rounders.

In the tradition of bat-and-ball games, baseball has roots going back centuries, and there are references to "baseball" from the beginning of the eighteenth century, and "rounders" from 1828. Baseball emerged as a distinct sport in 1892 when associations in Merseyside renamed the sport in favour of the more traditional rounders.

History 
Bat-and-ball games in Britain have a long history and a ball and bat game possibly ancestral to rounders and British baseball was attested as early as 1344. A game called "baseball" was attested in 1700 when a vicar in Maidstone decried its playing on a Sunday, and referenced in 1744 in the children's book A Little Pretty Pocket-Book where it was called Base-Ball. Jane Austen also included a passing reference to the game in Northanger Abbey.

19th Century 

In Merseyside, a strong community game had already developed with skills and plays more in keeping with the American game and the merseyside game began to informally adopt the name "baseball", to reflect the American style. By the 1890s, calls were made to follow the success of other working class sports like Soccer in Merseyside and adopt a distinct set of rules and bureaucracy.

During the 1892 season rules for the game of "baseball" were agreed and the game was officially codified. This was followed by the 'Liverpool Rounders Association' renaming themselves for "Baseball" and by the end of the season, baseball teams from Liverpool and Lancashire were invited to play matches at Cardiff Arms Park with the express purpose of popularising "the improved version of the old-fashioned game of rounders".

Early 20th century 
In Cardiff in 1922 and in 1926 the first women's international match took place between Wales and England.

The crowd at the 1924 Cardiff Arms Park men's international reached 10,000 spectators for the first time and the 1925 fixture at the Police Athletic Ground, Liverpool, saw a crowd of 12,000. The growth of the international fixture had brought increased scrutiny on the game's arbitration and rules, as such the English Baseball Association and the Welsh Baseball Union formed the International Baseball Board to oversee the internationals in 1927.

Depression, war and the American game (1929 to 1948) 
The decade also saw further moves to establish American baseball on Merseyside. The moves met with a mixed reception among players of the British game with some apprehensive the move would end the older game in England. Although British baseball would survive, the American league had a detrimental effect throughout the decade, with players, crowds and backers leaving the sport for a professional career in a game gaining support throughout England.

Post-war period (1948 to 1970) 
The sport was also enjoying popularity In England, with a number of Exhibition games played in London and teams established in Bristol and Coventry.

Modern era 

By 2006 participation levels in England had slumped considerably to a point where only four clubs remained active: All Saints, Anfield, Breckside and Townsend.

The centenary international was held in Cardiff on 19 July 2008, with Wales winning their tenth victory in a row by an innings and 44. As well as the full international, similar internationals are held for 'B' teams and for junior grades. The match was the 83rd international played between the two nations, and was Wales' 61st victory; England had won 20 and two games were declared draws due to inclement weather (1957 and 1998). Spectator numbers were reported to be between 1,000 and 2,000.

The annual England–Wales fixture continued until 2015 when England withdrew, unable to field enough players. The end of the international fixture (and the exposure it brought the game) had a dramatic effect on player numbers in Wales. By 2017, the Welsh men's league and cup fixtures were abandoned mid-season due to a lack of players at some member clubs. In 2021 the Welsh Men's League & Cup was restarted after a 6 years hiatus with 5 clubs, with 7 in 2022. A programme of teaching baseball in Cardiff & Vale schools also started this year with a view to a full youth and junior league restarting in 2023. The women's league has remained in operation.https://www.thenational.wales/sport/20590400.welsh-baseball-rebirth-sport-almost-lost/

Differences between the British and North American games 

The sport differs in a number of ways from the internationally known game of North American baseball.

 Delivery of the ball – The ball is thrown underarm, similar to softball. As in cricket the delivery is known as bowling. In North American baseball it is delivered overhand, sidearm, or underarm and is called pitching.
 Number of players – There are 11 players in a team with no substitutions allowed. North American baseball uses nine players on a team (not counting a "designated hitter"); while substitutions are allowed, a player who leaves the game may not re-enter it.
 Number of innings – (Note that British baseball uses the cricket terminology of "innings" as both singular and plural, while baseball uses "inning" for the singular.) In British baseball, each team has two innings. An innings ends when all 11 players are either dismissed or stranded on base. A regulation game of North American baseball consists of nine innings, and each team's half of an inning ends when three outs (dismissals) are recorded.
 Posts/Bases – Where North American baseball has bases the British version has 'posts' (sometimes referred to as bases). These are designated by poles rather than bags.
 Bat – the bat has a flat striking surface, where in North American baseball it is entirely round.
 Scoring system – In British baseball players score a run for every base reached after hitting the ball. The player will not subsequently score when moving around the bases on another player's hit. The equivalent of a home run scores four runs. As in cricket a bonus run can be awarded for excessively-wide deliveries. In North American baseball, a player scores a run only on a successful circuit of all four bases, whether on his own or another player's hit, or by other means such as a walk or stolen base.
 Uniform – Players wear colourful jerseys and shorts with English teams wearing soccer uniforms.
 Field of play – The British game has no foul area, a ball can be legally hit (and scored off of) in any direction, where in North American baseball it has to be hit in the zone bounded by the lines to first base and third base.

Despite these similarities with cricket, the game is much more like North American baseball in style and operates on a near identical, but smaller, diamond. There are also many similarities to rounders, which is often considered a transitional game between cricket and baseball. The basic concepts of British baseball cross-blend the basic concepts of cricket and the more standard versions of rounders.

References 

British baseball in the United Kingdom
Sport in England
Merseyside
Baseball genres
Ball and bat games
Team sports